The anthem of the Trujillo State, Venezuela, was written by Antonio Pacheco; the music was composed by Esteban Rasquin.

Lyrics in Spanish Language
Chorus 
¡De Trujillo es tan alta la gloria! 
¡De Trujillo es tan alto el honor! 
¡Niquitao es el valor en la historia 
y Santa Ana en la historia es amor!

I  
¡Oh Trujillo! El perdón de la patria 
que las armas los libre llamó: 
como un ángel radiante en justicia 
en tus campos ilustres brilló. 

II 
En tus campos es de Dios el trabajo, 
en tus pompas es libre el corcel, 
en tus pueblos palpita la vida,
y en tus valles se cuaja la miel. 

III 
Con Bolívar y Sucre, los genios 
de la procera lucha inmortal 
Cruz Carrillo llevó esa Bandera 
a remotas regiones triunfales.

See also
 List of anthems of Venezuela

Anthems of Venezuela
Spanish-language songs